Diyan Dimov (born 27 September 1985) is a Bulgarian former footballer who played as a midfielder.

References

External links 

1985 births
Living people
Sportspeople from Ruse, Bulgaria
Bulgarian footballers
FC Dunav Ruse players
PFC Ludogorets Razgrad players
PFC Svetkavitsa players
FC Etar 1924 Veliko Tarnovo players
FC Lyubimets players
FC CSKA 1948 Sofia players
First Professional Football League (Bulgaria) players
Association football midfielders